Shawn Camp may refer to:

 Shawn Camp (baseball), American baseball coach
 Shawn Camp (musician), American musician
 Shawn Camp (album), his self-titled debut album